James Nicol, Nichol, Nicholl or Nicoll may refer to:
 James Nicol (geologist) (1810–1879), Scottish geologist
 James Nicol (minister) (1769–1819), Scottish poet
 James Dyce Nicol (1805–1872), Scottish politician

 James Nicholl (1890–1955), Scottish footballer with Middlesbrough and Liverpool
 James Nicoll (born 1961), Usenet personality
 James Henderson Nicoll, Scottish paediatric surgeon
 Jimmie Nicol (born 1939), British drummer and temporary member of the Beatles
 Jimmy Nicholl (born 1956), football player and manager most known for time at Manchester United, Raith Rovers and Northern Ireland
 Jimmy Nichol (1903–1954), Scottish footballer with Gillingham and Portsmouth

See also
 James Nicoll Morris (1763–1830), Royal Navy officer